A news magazine or newsmagazine is a typed, printed, and published magazine, radio or television program, usually published weekly, consisting of articles about current events. News magazines generally discuss stories, in greater depth than newspapers or newscasts do, and aim to give the consumer an understanding of the important events beyond the basic facts.

Broadcast news magazines
Radio news magazines are similar to television news magazines.  Unlike radio newscasts, which are typically about five minutes in length, radio news magazines can run from 30 minutes to three hours or more.

Television news magazines provide a similar service to print news magazines, but their stories are presented as short television documentaries rather than written articles. These broadcasts serve as an alternative in covering certain issues more in depth than regular newscasts.  The formula, first established by Panorama on the BBC in 1953, has proved successful around the world. Television news magazines provide several stories not seen on regular newscasts, including celebrity profiles, coverage of big businesses, hidden camera techniques, better international coverage, exposing and correcting injustices, in-depth coverage of a headline story, and hot-topic interviews.

In the United States, television news magazines were very popular in the 1990s, since they were a cheap and easy way to better use the investment in national television network news departments. Television news magazines once aired five nights a week on most television networks. However, with the success of reality shows, news magazines have largely been supplanted. Reality shows cost slightly less to produce and attain a younger and more loyal audience than the news magazines they replaced. Thus, the audience once attracted to news magazine shows has largely drifted to cable television, where common news magazine topics such as nature, science, celebrities, and politics all have their own specialty channels.

Most commercial broadcasting television stations have local news that refers to news coverage of events in a local context which would not typically be of interest to those of other localities, or otherwise be of national or international scope.

Notable print news magazines

Notable TV news magazines

Australia
Four Corners
Dateline
60 Minutes
Revealed
Sunday Night

United States
20/20
60 Minutes
60 Minutes II
48 Hours
America Now
America's Heartland

Bill Moyers Journal
Business Nation
CBS News Sunday Morning
Connie Chung Tonight
Dateline NBC
Day One
E:60
Expose
Eye to Eye with Connie Chung
Frontline
Inside Edition
Now on PBS
Now with Tom Brokaw and Katie Couric
Primetime
Public Eye with Bryant Gumbel
Real Life with Jane Pauley
Rock Center with Brian Williams
Saturday Night with Connie Chung
Small Town Big Deal
Sunday Night with Megyn Kelly
Turning Point
Weekend

Canada
16×9
The Fifth Estate
Global Sunday
This Hour Has Seven Days
W5

Mexico
Noticieros Televisa
On Air. with Paola Rojas
The News with Karla Iberia Sánchez
On Point. with Denise Maerker

Italy

Ballarò
In ½ h

Philippines 

 
 
Probe
Reporter's Notebook

Rated Korina

United Kingdom
Dispatches
Exposure
Newsnight
On Assignment
The One Show
Good Morning Britain
This Morning
Panorama
Tonight
Unreported World

Other countries
Brazil

Bulgaria
Panorama

Chile
Contacto

Hong Kong
News Magazine (新聞透視)
Sunday Report (星期日檔案)
Spain
BCN Week

European Journal (Belgium/Germany)
 (Iceland)
 (Slovenia)
 (Croatia)
 (Colombia)
 (Germany)

Notable radio news magazines

International
 Newshour

Mexico
W noticias (XEW-AM)

Australia

 AM
 RN Breakfast
 PM
 The World Today

United Kingdom
 Breakfast (BBC Radio Five Live)
 Broadcasting House
 PM
 Today
 The World at One
 The World This Weekend
 The World Tonight
 Worricker on Sunday (Five Live)

United States
 All Things Considered
 America in The Morning
 Eye on the World
 Morning Edition (weekend version branded as Weekend Edition)
 This Morning, America's First News with Gordon Deal
 Weekend America
 The World

Canada
 Canada Live
 The Current
 The World at Six

See also
 News program
 News media

References

5.Este es un ejemplo de News Magazines: https://newsmagazinesbc.com

External links

 The Guardian article on newsmagazines
 WORLD podcast of a radio news magazine
  Merrian-Webster definition of news magazine
 A brief history of the TV news magazine TVNewser
 TV critic from The Buffalo News on TV newsmagazines

 
Magazine genres
Television genres
Television terminology